Schismatoglottis is a genus of flowering plants in the family Araceae. Members of the genus are similar in appearance and growth habit to those of the genus Homalomena, but the two genera are not closely related. The primary difference is that the leaves of Schismatoglottis are not aromatic. Schismatoglottis are found primarily in tropical parts of Southeast Asia, New Guinea, and Melanesia. The majority of the species are native to the Island of Borneo.

Schismatoglottis prietoi, described in 2015 from the Philippines, is uniquely fully aquatic or amphibious in habitat. It forms large colonies in shallow-fast-flowing freshwater rivers in lowland forests.

Species
Schismatoglottis acutifolia Engl. - Borneo
Schismatoglottis adoceta S.Y.Wong - Sarawak
Schismatoglottis ahmadii A.Hay - Borneo
Schismatoglottis ardenii A.Hay - Sarawak
Schismatoglottis asperata Engl. - Borneo
Schismatoglottis barbata Engl. - Sarawak
Schismatoglottis bauensis A.Hay & C.Lee - Sarawak
Schismatoglottis bifasciata Engl. - Borneo
Schismatoglottis bogneri A.Hay - Luzon, Mindoro
Schismatoglottis brevicuspis Hook.f. - Thailand, Malaysia, Sumatra
Schismatoglottis calyptrata (Roxb.) Zoll. & Moritzi - Guangxi, Taiwan, Indochina, Philippines, Malaysia, Indonesia, New Guinea, Solomon Islands, Bismarck Archipelago, Vanuatu
Schismatoglottis canaliculata Engl. - Borneo
Schismatoglottis ciliata A.Hay - Sarawak
Schismatoglottis clarae A.Hay - Sarawak
Schismatoglottis clausula S.Y.Wong - Sarawak
Schismatoglottis clemensiorum A.Hay - Sabah
Schismatoglottis confinis S.Y.Wong & P.C.Boyce - Sarawak
Schismatoglottis conoidea Engl. - Sarawak
Schismatoglottis convolvula P.C.Boyce - Sarawak
Schismatoglottis corneri A.Hay - Borneo, Anambas
Schismatoglottis crinitissima A.Hay - Borneo
Schismatoglottis cyria P.C.Boyce - Brunei
Schismatoglottis decipiens A.Hay - Sabah
Schismatoglottis dilecta S.Y.Wong, P.C.Boyce & S.L.Low - Sarawak
Schismatoglottis dulosa S.Y.Wong - Sarawak
Schismatoglottis ecaudata A.Hay - Sumatra
Schismatoglottis edanoi A.Hay - Samar in Philippines
Schismatoglottis elegans A.Hay - Sarawak
Schismatoglottis erecta M.Hotta - Sarawak
Schismatoglottis eximia Engl. - Borneo
Schismatoglottis eymae A.Hay - Sulawesi
Schismatoglottis ferruginea Merr. - Sabah
Schismatoglottis gamoandra M.Hotta - Sarawak
Schismatoglottis gillianiae P.C.Boyce - Brunei
Schismatoglottis glauca Engl. - Borneo
Schismatoglottis grabowskii Engl. - Kalimantan Selatan
Schismatoglottis hainanensis H.Li - Hainan
Schismatoglottis harmandii Engl. - Laos
Schismatoglottis hayana Bogner & P.C.Boyce - Sarawak
Schismatoglottis hayi S.Y.Wong & P.C.Boyce - Sarawak
Schismatoglottis hottae Bogner & Nicolson - Brunei
Schismatoglottis ifugaoensis S.Y.Wong, Bogner & P.C.Boyce - Luzon
Schismatoglottis inculta Kurniawan & P.C.Boyce - Sulawesi
Schismatoglottis jelandii P.C.Boyce & S.Y.Wong - Sarawak
Schismatoglottis jepomii P.C.Boyce & S.Y.Wong - Sarawak
Schismatoglottis jitinae S.Y.Wong - Sarawak
Schismatoglottis josefii A.Hay - Sarawak
Schismatoglottis kurzii Hook.f. - Myanmar
Schismatoglottis lancifolia Hallier f. & Engl. - Borneo
Schismatoglottis latevaginata Engl. - Borneo
Schismatoglottis linae S.Y.Wong - Sarawak
Schismatoglottis lingua A.Hay - Sabah
Schismatoglottis longispatha W.Bull - Sarawak
Schismatoglottis luzonensis Engl. - Philippines
Schismatoglottis maelii P.C.Boyce & S.Y.Wong - Sarawak
Schismatoglottis matangensis S.Y.Wong - Sarawak
Schismatoglottis mayoana Bogner & M.Hotta - Sarawak
Schismatoglottis merrillii Engl. - Luzon
Schismatoglottis mindanaoana Engl. - Mindanao
Schismatoglottis mira S.Y.Wong, P.C.Boyce & S.L.Low - Sarawak
Schismatoglottis modesta Schott - Kalimantan Tengah
Schismatoglottis monoplacenta M.Hotta - Sarawak
Schismatoglottis moodii A.Hay - Sabah
Schismatoglottis motleyana (Schott) Engl. - Borneo
Schismatoglottis multiflora Ridl. - Borneo
Schismatoglottis multinervia M.Hotta - Sarawak
Schismatoglottis nervosa Ridl. - Sarawak
Schismatoglottis niahensis A.Hay - Sarawak
Schismatoglottis nicolsonii A.Hay - Sarawak
Schismatoglottis patentinervia Engl. - Borneo
Schismatoglottis pectinervia A.Hay - Brunei
Schismatoglottis penangensis Engl - Penang
Schismatoglottis petri A.Hay - Brunei
Schismatoglottis platystigma M.Hotta - Brunei
Schismatoglottis plurivenia Alderw. - Philippines, Sulawesi
Schismatoglottis prietoi P.C.Boyce, Medecilo & S.Y.Wong - Philippines
Schismatoglottis puberulipes Alderw. - Borneo
Schismatoglottis pudenda A.Hay - Sarawak
Schismatoglottis pumila Hallier f. ex Engl. - Borneo
Schismatoglottis pusilla Engl. - Philippines
Schismatoglottis pyrrhias A.Hay - Sarawak
Schismatoglottis retinervia Furtado - Sabah
Schismatoglottis roseospatha Bogner - Sarawak
Schismatoglottis samarensis A.Hay - Samar in Philippines
Schismatoglottis sarikeensis (Bogner & M.Hotta) A.Hay & Bogner - Sarawak
Schismatoglottis schottii Bogner & Nicolson - Borneo
Schismatoglottis scortechinii Hook.f. - Peninsular Malaysia
Schismatoglottis sejuncta A.Hay - Brunei
Schismatoglottis silamensis A.Hay - Sabah
Schismatoglottis simonii S.Y.Wong - Sarawak
Schismatoglottis subundulata (Zoll. ex Schott) Nicolson - Sulawesi
Schismatoglottis tahubangensis A.Hay & Hersc. - Sabah
Schismatoglottis tecturata (Schott) Engl. - Borneo, Riau Islands
Schismatoglottis tessellata S.Y.Wong - Sarawak
Schismatoglottis thelephora S.Y.Wong, P.C.Boyce & S.L.Low - Sarawak
Schismatoglottis trifasciata Engl. - Borneo
Schismatoglottis trivittata Hallier - Borneo
Schismatoglottis trusmadiensis A.Hay & Mood - Sabah
Schismatoglottis turbata S.Y.Wong - Sarawak
Schismatoglottis ulusarikeiensis S.Y.Wong - Sarawak
Schismatoglottis unifolia A.Hay & P.C.Boyce - Sabah
Schismatoglottis venusta A.Hay - Sabah
Schismatoglottis viridissima A.Hay - Sarawak
Schismatoglottis wahaiana Alderw. - Seram in Maluku
Schismatoglottis wallichii Hook.f. - Thailand, Malaysia, Borneo, Sumatra
Schismatoglottis warburgiana Engl. - Sagapan, Mindanao
Schismatoglottis wongii A.Hay - Sabah
Schismatoglottis zonata Hallier f. - - Borneo

See also
Homalonema
Adelonema

References

Aroideae
Araceae genera
Taxa named by Heinrich Zollinger
Taxa named by Alexander Moritzi